Arthur Schröder (20 February 1892 – 4 February 1986) was a German actor.

Selected filmography
 The Queen's Love Letter (1916)
 Cain (1918)
 Mania (1918)
 Just Once a Great Lady (1934)
 Hubertus Castle (1934)
 His Late Excellency (1935)
 Der Etappenhase (1937)
 The Beaver Coat (1937)
 The Stars Shine (1938)
 Marriage in Small Doses (1939)
 Robert and Bertram (1939)
 The Girl at the Reception (1940)
 Quax the Crash Pilot (1941)
 Happiness is the Main Thing (1941)
 Diesel (1942)
 I Entrust My Wife to You (1943)
The Master of the Estate (1943)
 The Green Salon (1944)
 The Noltenius Brothers (1945)
 The Axe of Wandsbek (1951)
 Three Days of Fear (1952)
 Canaris Master Spy (1954)
 The Angel with the Flaming Sword (1954)
 The Night of the Storm (1957)
 Escape from Sahara (1958)
 Freddy, the Guitar and the Sea (1959)

References

External links
 

1892 births
1986 deaths
Male actors from Hamburg
German male film actors
German male silent film actors
20th-century German male actors